San Francisco is a municipality in the Honduran department of Lempira.

It is one of the furthest municipalities of the Lempira department in Honduras.

History 

The lands for this municipality were given away by the King of Spain, on 30 October 1692, composed of 2 titles, "Santa Maria Magdalena" and "San Lucas". In the census of 1791 it appears as part of "Curato de Cerquin". It was founded in 1837 for the initiative of Captain Jeronimo Acosta. The church was built in 1856, a historical relic left by the Spanish colonist. But as it can be seen in the photo in this article, the date on the church is 1737. Something worth verifying. In the national division of 1896, it was one of the municipalities of Erandique district.

Geography 

The municipality capital is located at the toe of "Gelpoa" hill. To get to this capital it is necessary to go up and down mountains and hills, mostly going down, while doing this, the elevation from sea level decreases, this is why the vegetation is typical of dry sub tropical forests. The weather is warm most of the year. In some uninhabited places there are pine forests.

Boundaries 
Its boundaries are: 
North : Erandique municipalities.
South : Intibuca department.
East  : Intibuca municipality.
West  : Erandique and Piraera municipalities.
Area: 133 km²

Resources 

The main products of this municipality are corn and beans. There are very few areas suitable for coffee plantations. The water for human consumption is obtained for excavated wells and some small streams nearby. Cattle and milk products are for local consumption. As does the rest of the department, it has electricity, mobile communication services and internet access at the mayor's office. Groceries stores are quite plentiful. In some houses, people sell gasoline and diesel fuel.

Population 
It is very common to see people who are descendants of the Indians, followed by a few individuals of cross-breed of Spanish and Indians.
Population:This municipality had in 2001 the amount of 8,086. This was used to elaborate and estimate resulting in 9,143.
Villages: 7
Settlements: 86

Demographics
At the time of the 2013 Honduras census, San Francisco municipality had a population of 9,017. Of these, 91.76% were Indigenous, 7.53% Mestizo, 0.69% Black or Afro-Honduran and 0.02% White.

Tourism 

Both ways to get there require a great deal of endurance and patience. If the visitor is in Gracias, then he must go to San Juan del Caite, Intibuca for the junction of the road the "San Miguelito, Intibuca" or Erandique. If the visitor is in "La Esperanza, Intibuca", then they must go to "San Miguelito" and after that to "Dolores,Intibuca". There is another junction of the road from Erandique and Dolores, Intibuca in a community called "San Antonio". This road is in bad shape half of the year, so caution is advised. It has little to offer to the visitors. Perhaps the antique church is the best attraction. But that is not a problem at all; because there is a DVD store, where the visitor can find the newest Hollywood premieres, on the other hand, the nearest place to fix a flat tire is 30 km away in Erandique. The people are very welcoming and kind to the foreigners.

Local Holidays: "Virgen del Carmen"  day on 16 July and also "San Francisco de Asis" day, 4 October.

References

External links

Municipalities of the Lempira Department